Todd Anthony Bennett (6 July 1962 – 16 July 2013) was a British athlete who competed mainly in the 400 metres.

Athletics career
Bennett competed for Great Britain in the 1984 Summer Olympics held in Los Angeles, United States in the 4 x 400 metre relay where he won the silver medal with his teammates Kriss Akabusi, Garry Cook and Philip Brown.

Bennett's international career started in 1981 where he took the 400m title at the European Junior Championships as well as forming one quarter of the silver medal-winning 4x400m squad. His success at these championships marked the start of a decade at the top of his sport in which he attended all major championships both indoor and outdoor. Perfectly proportioned for running indoors, Bennett was European Indoor Champion over 400m in both 1985 and 1987 and also took a silver medal over 400m at the World Indoor Championships in 1985. This was the same year that he also became World Indoor Record Holder for the 400m in 45.56 seconds.

During his career Bennett competed in three Commonwealth Games Championships. At the 1982 Commonwealth Games in Brisbane, Queensland, Australia he competed for England over 400m where he was placed 5th and was a member of the gold medal-winning 4x400m squad. Four years later he represented England at the 1986 Commonwealth Games in Edinburgh, Scotland, where he was second in the 200 metres. In his final Commonwealth Games in 1990 in Auckland, New Zealand, he finished 8th in the 400 metres.

Throughout his career, Bennett was a central member of the Great Britain 4x400m squad. As a member of this squad, he attended two Olympic Games in 1984 (2nd) and 1988 (5th) and two World Championships in 1983 (3rd) and 1987 (2nd). He also attended four Europa Cup competitions as part of this squad and in his four appearances obtained three gold medals.

Coaching
After retirement from competition, Bennett maintained his links with athletics. He worked with the Great Britain Junior Athletics Team and for four years was their Team Manager. From 2003 Bennett worked as the National 400m event coach for the Senior women and was in Athens, Greece when the team came 4th, running the fastest time by a British team for ten years. During this period Bennett also coached his own group of athletes, several gaining international honours.

Bennett died from cancer on 16 July 2013.

References

1962 births
2013 deaths
English male sprinters
British male sprinters
Commonwealth Games gold medallists for England
Commonwealth Games silver medallists for England
Athletes (track and field) at the 1982 Commonwealth Games
Athletes (track and field) at the 1986 Commonwealth Games
Athletes (track and field) at the 1990 Commonwealth Games
Olympic silver medallists for Great Britain
Athletes (track and field) at the 1984 Summer Olympics
Athletes (track and field) at the 1988 Summer Olympics
Olympic athletes of Great Britain
Commonwealth Games medallists in athletics
World Athletics Championships athletes for Great Britain
World Athletics Championships medalists
European Athletics Championships medalists
Sportspeople from Southampton
Deaths from cancer in England
Medalists at the 1984 Summer Olympics
Olympic silver medalists in athletics (track and field)
World Athletics Indoor Championships medalists
Medallists at the 1982 Commonwealth Games
Medallists at the 1986 Commonwealth Games